Impact Is Imminent is the fourth studio album by American thrash metal band Exodus, released in 1990. Impact Is Imminent was Exodus' first album on Capitol Records as well as their first album to feature John Tempesta on drums. It was also the last studio album to feature Rob McKillop on bass, though he appeared on their first live album, Good Friendly Violent Fun, which was recorded live in 1989 but not released until 1991. Impact Is Imminent was re-released in 2008 in a limited edition mini-album packaging to resemble the original vinyl release, including the inner sleeve.

Guitarist Gary Holt expressed some regret for the album during the making of 2010’s Exhibit B: The Human Condition, stating that "if there was one album I could have back and record again it would be Impact." He went on to praise the album for having "some of the best riffs I've ever written."

Holt restated his opinion of the record during an April 2020 interview with Robb Flynn of Machine Head: "I listen back to Impact Is Imminent, and if there’s one album in my career I wish... I had it back, like it’d never been released, it’s that album, because it’s got some of the best riffs I ever wrote. I mean, the main riff to ‘Impact Is Imminent’ is my favorite riff I’ve ever written. It’s crazy, the string skipping, no one had ever done that shit."

Tour
Exodus spent the latter half of 1990 touring in support of Impact Is Imminent. The band opened for funk rock act Red Hot Chili Peppers (who were labelmates with Exodus at the time) at The Kaiser Center in Oakland on July 21, 1990. Exodus was part of two major tours: in August 1990, they toured the U.S. with Suicidal Tendencies and Pantera, and three months later, they toured Europe with Flotsam and Jetsam, Vio-lence and Forbidden. Exodus wrapped up the tour on December 28, 1990, at The Fillmore. The band was scheduled to tour Europe again in 1991 with Judas Priest and Annihilator but they were replaced by Pantera.

Reception

Impact Is Imminent received a negative review from AllMusic's Eduardo Rivadavia, who called it "the most forgettable album of Exodus' career." Canadian journalist Martin Popoff appreciated Exodus' "adherence to an older, lost speed metal rant" and wrote that fans might want to come back and revisit songs that were quickly skipped in favour of more "pushier works".

Despite being released on a major label, Impact Is Imminent was not as successful as Fabulous Disaster and debuted at No. 137 on the Billboard 200, Exodus' lowest chart position to date. Until the release of Blood In, Blood Out In 2014, Impact Is Imminent would be Exodus' last album to enter the Billboard 200.

Track listing

Personnel
Exodus
 Steve "Zetro" Souza – vocals
 Gary Holt – guitars, producer
 Rick Hunolt – guitars, producer
 Rob McKillop – bass
 John Tempesta – drums

Production
 Csaba Petocz – engineer
 John Bush, Lewis Demetri, Chris Fuhrman, Andy Newell, Jim McKee – additional engineering
 Steve Heinke, Lawrence Ethan, Shawna Stobie, Ulrich Wild, Casey McMackin, Manny Lacarrubba – assistant engineers
 Marc Senesac – mixing at Alpha & Omega
 Stephen Marcussen – mastering at Precision Mastering

Charts

Album

References

Exodus (American band) albums
1990 albums
Capitol Records albums